Niki Emil Antonio Mäenpää (born 23 January 1985) is a Finnish professional footballer who plays as a goalkeeper for  club Venezia and the Finland national team. He began his senior club career playing for Lens Reserves, before signing with Den Bosch at age 21 in 2006.

Mäenpää made his international debut for Finland in June 2008, at the age of 23, and has since had over 20 caps, including appearing in 2014 FIFA World Cup qualification.

Club career

Lens
Mäenpää was born in Espoo, Finland. He started his senior career at Lens Reserves in 2003. During winter 2006 transfer window, he joined Telstar on loan until the end of the season. He did not feature in any Ligue 1 match in the first team of RC Lens. His contract with Lens expired on 30 June 2006.

FC Den Bosch
During summer 2006, Mäenpää joined Dutch Eerste Divisie side FC Den Bosch on a free transfer. He made his breakthrough in season 2006–07 when he played 27 league matches. He made a total of 67 league appearances during 3 seasons. His contract with FC Den Bosch expired in summer 2009.

Willem II
In summer 2009, Mäenpää joined Dutch Eredivisie side Willem II on a free transfer, making 18 league appearances. He left Willem II in summer 2011, by terminating his contract after they got relegated to Eerste Divisie.

AZ Alkmaar
On 3 October 2011, Mäenpää joined AZ Alkmaar on a free transfer on a contract until the end of the season, joining compatriot and team captain Niklas Moisander. However at AZ, he found himself demoted to third-choice, behind Esteban Alvarado and the veteran Erik Heijblok. He left the club after only one season, without making a single appearance for the AZ's first team.

VVV-Venlo
On 29 May 2012, it was announced that Mäenpää had signed a three-year contract with fellow Eredivisie side VVV-Venlo. Despite being sent off three minutes into his debut match, the fans voted him as best Venlo player of the season 2013–14. In the summer of 2015 he left VVV Venlo on a free transfer after his contract expired

Brighton & Hove Albion
On 6 July 2015, it was announced that Mäenpää had signed a contract with English side Brighton & Hove Albion following his release from VVV-Venlo. He made his Brighton & Hove Albion league debut in a 3–0 victory over Rotherham at Falmer Stadium on 16 August 2016. At the end of 2017–18 season, he left the club.

Bristol City
On 1 August 2018, Mäenpää signed for EFL Championship club Bristol City. On 4 August 2018, he made his debut in a match against Nottingham Forest. On 21 May 2019, it was announced an option to extend his contract was triggered and he would be remaining with The Robins for the 2019–20 season.

Stoke City
Mäenpää signed a short-term contract with Stoke City on 27 November 2020 to act as cover for Josef Bursik following injuries to Adam Davies and Angus Gunn. However he suffered an injury himself in his first training session and Stoke brought in Andy Lonergan.

Venezia
On 15 February 2021, Mäenpää joined Italian Serie B club Venezia until the end of the 2020–21 season, with an option for the 2021–22 season. In June 2021 it was announced that he had signed a two-year contract to remain at the club until the end of June 2023.

International career
Mäenpää was 18 years old on 1 April 2003 when he debuted in Finland's youth team in a match against Sweden in Malmö. He played his first game in Finland national under-21 football team 30 March 2004 in Corradino in a match against Malta. He gained 13 caps for Finland's U21-team.

Mäenpää made his debut for the Finland national team on 2 June 2008 in a friendly match in Veritas Stadion, Turku against Belarus when Stuart Baxter chose him for the starting line up. During 2012 he established himself as a regular in the Finland national team and gained six caps. He played his first FIFA World Cup qualification game on 12 October 2012 in Helsinki Olympic Stadium when Mixu Paatelainen chose him for the starting eleven in a match against Georgia. He played one of his best games in March 2013 when Finland got a surprising 1–1 away draw against Spain in qualifying for the 2014 World Cup. He established himself as the national team's regular goalkeeper and played seven out of eight matches in qualification, and 20 matches in total during 2012–2014.

Career statistics

Club

International

Honours
Finland
Baltic Cup: runner-up 2012; third place 2014

References

External links

 Brighton & Hove Albion F.C. official profile
 
 
 
 
 
 
 
 

Living people
1985 births
Footballers from Espoo
Finnish footballers
Finland international footballers
Finland youth international footballers
Finland under-21 international footballers
Association football goalkeepers
Helsingin Jalkapalloklubi players
RC Lens players
SC Telstar players
FC Den Bosch players
Willem II (football club) players
AZ Alkmaar players
VVV-Venlo players
Eredivisie players
Eerste Divisie players
Brighton & Hove Albion F.C. players
Bristol City F.C. players
Stoke City F.C. players
Venezia F.C. players
English Football League players
Finnish expatriate footballers
Expatriate footballers in France
Expatriate footballers in the Netherlands
Finnish expatriate sportspeople in the Netherlands
Expatriate footballers in England
Expatriate footballers in Italy
Finnish expatriate sportspeople in Italy